Arthur Twiss Kemble (3 February 1862 – 13 March 1925) was an English sportsman who played international rugby union for England and first-class cricket with Lancashire.

Kemble, a wicket-keeper, made his first-class debut in 1885 but had to wait until the retirement of gloveman Dick Pilling to become a regular fixture in the team. He had 50 dismissals in the 1891 season, the most by any wicket-keeper that year in English first-class cricket. Although he was unable to repeat his effort of effecting the most dismissals the following season, 1892, he did finish with the most stumpings. Other first-class teams that he played for during his career include AJ Webbe's XI, CI Thornton's XI and the Gentlemen of England.

On the rugby field, Kemble played for Liverpool. A forward, he was capped three times for England. He made two appearances in the 1885 Home Nations Championship, both of which England won. His other Test cap came against Ireland in the 1887 Home Nations.

Family and career
Kemble was the son of the Rev. N. F. Y. Kemble, the vicar of Allerton, Liverpool; he qualified as a solicitor in 1891 and was chairman of Garston District Council and a member of Liverpool City Council.

References

1862 births
1925 deaths
English rugby union players
England international rugby union players
English cricketers
Lancashire cricketers
North v South cricketers
Liverpool and District cricketers
Gentlemen cricketers
Gentlemen of England cricketers
C. I. Thornton's XI cricketers
A. J. Webbe's XI cricketers
People from Crawley Down
Rugby union players from Cumbria
Wicket-keepers
Liverpool St Helens F.C. players